The discography of Australian alternative rock band Birds of Tokyo consists of six  studio albums, one compilation album, one live album, three EPs and thirty one singles.

Albums

Studio albums

Live albums

Compilation albums

Extended plays

Singles

Notes

DVDs

References

Discographies of Australian artists
Rock music group discographies
Rhythm and blues discographies